Gripa Tombrapa is a female Nigerian professional cyclist. She won a gold medal while representing Nigeria in the women's time trial cycling event alongside Happiness Okafor, Glory Odiase, and Rosemary Marcus at the 2015 All-Africa Games in Congo Brazzaville.

References

Year of birth missing (living people)
Living people
Nigerian female cyclists
African Games medalists in cycling
African Games gold medalists for Nigeria
Competitors at the 2015 African Games
21st-century Nigerian women